Álvaro Urquijo (born 22 June 1962) is a Spanish guitarist and singer-songwriter who is known as one of the founding members of the pop rock group, Los Secretos.

He founded Los Secretos with his brothers Javier and Enrique Urquijo in 1980.

Discography

With Los Secretos
Tos (1978)
Los Secretos EP (1980)
Los Secretos (1981)
Todo siguel igual (1982)
Algo más (1983)
Lo mejor (1985)
El primer cruce (1986)
Continuará (1987)
Directo (1988)
La calle del olvido (1990)
Adiós tristeza (1991)
Cambio de planes (1993)
Ojos de gata (1994)
Dos caras distintas (1996)
La historia de Los Secretos y CD de grandes éxtios(1996)
CD Grandes éxitos II (1999)
A tu lado (2000)

Solo career
Álvaro Urquijo (1998)

Contribution with Taxi (2008)

In 2008, he was featured on Gibraltarian band Taxi's latest single, Quiero Un Camino.

References 

1962 births
Singers from Madrid
Spanish male singers
Spanish singer-songwriters
Spanish guitarists
Spanish male guitarists
Living people
Musicians from Madrid
Writers from Madrid